Anoplophora beryllina is a species of beetle in the family Cerambycidae. It is distributed in China, Myanmar, India, Laos, and Vietnam.

References

External links 
 

Lamiini
Beetles described in 1840
Beetles of Asia